Jacques Guilbault (born 29 October 1936 in Montreal, Quebec) was a Liberal party member of the House of Commons of Canada. He was a professional engineer by career.

He was elected in the 1968 federal election at Saint-Jacques riding and was re-elected in five more general elections. He served six consecutive terms of office from the 28th through the 33rd Canadian Parliaments.

During the 30th Parliament, he was Parliamentary Secretary to the Secretary of State for a year beginning October 1976. This was immediately followed by a year as Secretary to the Minister of National Defence. In his final Parliamentary term from 1984 to 1988, Guilbault was the Liberal deputy House leader during a Progressive Conservative government.

Guilbault was defeated in the 1988 federal election by Benoît Tremblay of the Progressive Conservative party. Guilbault campaigned in the Rosemont electoral district for this election, following the dissolution of his long-time Saint-Jacques riding.

Electoral record (partial)

References

External links
 

1936 births
French Quebecers
Liberal Party of Canada MPs
Living people
Members of the House of Commons of Canada from Quebec
Politicians from Montreal